Isnairo Reis Silva Morais (born 6 January 1993), simply known as Reis, is a Brazilian professional footballer who plays as a midfielder for Jeju United.

Honours
Confiança
Campeonato Sergipano: 2020

References

External links

1993 births
Living people
Brazilian footballers
Association football midfielders
Brazilian expatriate footballers
Brazilian expatriate sportspeople in South Korea
Expatriate footballers in South Korea
Campeonato Brasileiro Série A players
Campeonato Brasileiro Série B players
Campeonato Brasileiro Série C players
Campeonato Brasileiro Série D players
K League 1 players
K League 2 players
Clube do Remo players
Atlético Clube Goianiense players
Sport Club Internacional players
América Futebol Clube (RN) players
Sociedade Esportiva e Recreativa Caxias do Sul players
Boa Esporte Clube players
Vila Nova Futebol Clube players
Criciúma Esporte Clube players
Associação Desportiva Confiança players
Gwangju FC players
Jeju United FC players
Sportspeople from Pará